Sopan Baug is a posh area in Pune, Maharashtra, western India. It is situated around a fruit orchard of the same name. It is accessible by the BT Kavade Road and the Prince of Wales Drive. Situated nearby is Uday Baug.

Sopan Baug has a number of apartment complexes near it. The most well known of them are Florentine and Midtown Societies. A railway runs near Sopan Baug.
Sopan Baug became one of the most sought after residential destination due to its close proximity to Koregaon Park. Some of the prominent residential complexes of Sopanbaug which have super luxurious flats and apartments. There are number of good schools nearby like Army Public School, Bishops Camp, St. Vincents.

Neighbourhoods in Pune